The Drake Passage (referred to as Mar de Hoces ["Hoces Sea"] in Spanish-speaking countries) is the body of water between South America's Cape Horn, Chile, Argentina and the South Shetland Islands of Antarctica. It connects the southwestern part of the Atlantic Ocean (Scotia Sea) with the southeastern part of the Pacific Ocean and extends into the Southern Ocean. The passage is named after the 16th-century English explorer and privateer Sir Francis Drake.

The Drake Passage is considered one of the most treacherous voyages for ships to make. Currents at its latitude meet no resistance from any landmass, and waves top , hence its reputation as "the most powerful convergence of seas".

As the Drake Passage is the narrowest passage around Antarctica, its existence and shape strongly influence the circulation of water around Antarctica and the global oceanic circulation, as well as the global climate. The bathymetry of the Drake Passage plays an important role in the global mixing of oceanic water.

History
Sailing south from the entrance of the Strait of Magellan, Spanish navigator Francisco de Hoces discovered this passage in 1525, making him the first European to pass through it. For this reason, it appears as Mar de Hoces in most Spanish and Spanish American maps and sources.

The passage received its English name from Sir Francis Drake during his raiding expedition. After passing through the Strait of Magellan with Marigold, Elizabeth, and his flagship Golden Hind, Drake entered the Pacific Ocean and was blown far south in a tempest. Marigold was lost, and Elizabeth abandoned the fleet. Only Drake's Golden Hind entered the passage. This incident demonstrated to the English that there was open water south of South America.

The first recorded voyage through the passage was that of Eendracht, captained by the Dutch navigator Jacob Le Maire in 1616, naming Cape Horn in the process.

The first human-powered transit (by rowing) across the passage was accomplished on December 25, 2019. Their accomplishment became the subject of a 2020 documentary, The Impossible Row.

Geography
The Drake Passage opened when Antarctica separated from South America due to plate tectonics.  There is much debate about when that occurred.  The opening had a major effect on the global oceans due to deep currents like the Antarctic Circumpolar Current (ACC). This opening could have been a primary cause of changes in global circulation and climate, as well as the rapid expansion of Antarctic ice sheets, because as Antarctica was encircled by ocean currents it was cut off from receiving heat from warmer regions. Precise dating of the earliest opening of the Drake Passage is complicated by the existence of plate fragments, which have been reconstructed to show the age of the earliest opening.

The  passage between Cape Horn and Livingston Island is the shortest crossing from Antarctica to another landmass. The boundary between the Atlantic and Pacific Oceans is sometimes taken to be a line drawn from Cape Horn to Snow Island ( north of mainland Antarctica), though the International Hydrographic Organization defines it as the meridian that passes through Cape Horn—67° 16′ W. Both lines lie within the Drake Passage.

The other two passages around the extreme southern part of South America (though not going around Cape Horn as such), the Strait of Magellan and Beagle Channel, are narrow, leaving little maneuvering room for a ship. They can become icebound. Sometimes the wind blows so strongly that no sailing vessel can make headway against it. Most sailing ships thus prefer the Drake Passage, which is open water for hundreds of miles.

No significant land sits at the latitudes of the Drake Passage. That is important to the unimpeded flow eastward of the Antarctic Circumpolar Current, which carries a huge volume of water through the passage and around Antarctica.

The passage hosts whales, dolphins and seabirds including giant petrels, other petrels, albatrosses and penguins.

Importance in physical oceanography 

The presence of the Drake Passage allows the three main ocean basins (Atlantic, Pacific and Indian) to be connected via the Antarctic Circumpolar current, the strongest oceanic current, with an estimated transport of 100–150 Sv (Sverdrups, million m3/s). This flow is the only large-scale exchange occurring between the global oceans, and the Drake passage is the narrowest passage on its flow around Antarctica. A significant amount of research has been done in understanding how the shape of the Drake passage (bathymetry and width) affects the global climate.

Oceanic and climate interactions 
"Major features of the modern ocean’s temperature and salinity fields, including the overall thermal asymmetry between the hemispheres, the relative saltiness of deep water formed in the northern hemisphere, and the existence of a transequatorial conveyor circulation, develop after Drake Passage is opened". 

The importance of an open Drake Passage extends far more than the Southern Ocean latitudes. The Roaring Forties and the Furious Fifties blow around Antarctica and drive the Antarctic Circumpolar Current. As a result of the Ekman Transport, water gets transported northward from the Antarctic Circumpolar Current (on the left-hand side while facing the stream direction). Using a lagrangian approach, water parcels passing through the Drake Passage can be followed in their journey in the oceans. Around 23 Sv of water is transported from the Drake Passage to the equator, mainly in the Atlantic and Pacific oceans. To make a blunt comparison, this value is not far from the Gulf Stream transport in the Florida Strait (33 Sv), but is an order of magnitude lower than the transport of the Antarctic Circumpolar Current (100–150 Sv). Water transported from the Southern Ocean to the Northern Hemisphere contributes to the global mass balance and permits the meridional circulation across the oceans.

Several studies linked the current shape of the Drake Passage to an effective Atlantic Meridional Overturning Circulation (AMOC). Models have been run with different widths and depths of the Drake Passage, and consequent changes in the global oceanic circulation and temperature distribution have been analysed. It appears that the “conveyor belt” of the global Thermohaline Circulation appears only in presence of an open Drake Passage, subject to wind forcing. In particular, with a closed Drake Passage, there is no North Atlantic Deep Water cell, and no Antarctic Circumpolar Current (obviously, as Antarctica is not completely surrounded by water). With a shallower Drake Passage, a weak Antarctic Circumpolar Current appears, but still no North Atlantic Deep Water cell.

It has also been shown that present-day distribution of dissolved inorganic carbon can be obtained only with an open Drake Passage.

In short, not only the Drake Passage must be open to allow the Antarctic Circumpolar Current to flow around Antarctica, but also the current topography is the only one that allows enough transport from the Southern Ocean to sustain a North Atlantic Deep Water cell, thus allowing a sufficiently strong thermohaline circulation.

To make a connection with the global surface temperature, an open (and sufficiently deep) Drake Passage cools the Southern Ocean and warms the high latitudes of the northern hemisphere. Indeed, the isolation of Antarctica by the Antarctic Circumpolar Current (that can flow only with an open Drake Passage) is credited by many researchers with causing the glaciation of the continent and global cooling in the Eocene epoch.

Turbulence and mixing 
Diapycnal mixing is the process by which different layers of a stratified fluid mix. It directly affects vertical gradients, thus it is of great importance in all the gradient-driven type of transport and circulation (such as the thermohaline circulation). In a simplified way, mixing drives the global thermohaline circulation: without internal mixing, cooler water would never be above warmer water, and there would be no density(buoyancy)-driven circulation. However, mixing in the interior of most of the ocean is thought to be ten times weaker than required to support the global circulation. It has been hypothesised that the extra-mixing can be ascribed to breaking of internal waves (Lee waves). When a stratified fluid reaches an internal obstacle, a wave is created that can eventually break, mixing the fluid’s layers. It has been estimated that the diapycnal diffusivity in the Drake Passage is ~20 times the value immediately to the west in the Pacific sector of the Antarctic Circumpolar Current. Much of the energy that is dissipated through internal wave breaking (around 20% of the wind energy put into the ocean) gets dissipated in the southern ocean.

In short, without the coarse topography in the depths of the Drake Passage, oceanic internal mixing would be weaker, and the global circulation would be affected.

Historical importance in oceanographic observations 
Worldwide satellite measurements of oceanic properties are available since the 1980s. Before then, data could be only gathered through oceanic ships taking direct measurements. The Antarctic Circumpolar Current has been (and is) surveyed making repeated transects. South America and the Antarctic Peninsula constrain the Antarctic Circumpolar Current in the Drake Passage: the convenience of measuring the Antarctic Circumpolar Current across the passage lays in the clear boundaries of the current in that stripe. Even after the advent of satellite altimetry data, direct observations in the Drake Passage have not lost their exceptionality. The relative shallowness and narrowness of the passage makes it particularly suitable to assess the validity of horizontally and vertically changing quantities (such as velocity in Ekman’s classic theory).

In addition, the strength of the Antarctic Circumpolar Current makes meanders and pinching cold-core cyclonic rings easier to observe.

Fauna
Wildlife in the Drake Passage includes the following species:

Birds

Cetaceans

Gallery

See also

 Elizabeth Island (Cape Horn)
 Garcia de Nodal expedition
 Bransfield Strait
 Sars Bank
 Timeline of Francis Drake's circumnavigation

References

External links

 National Oceanography Centre, Southampton page of the important and complex bathymetry of the Passage
 A NASA image of an eddy in the Passage
 Larger-scale images of the passage from the US Navy (Rain, ice edge and wind images) 

Francis Drake
Straits of Chile
Straits of Antarctica
Bodies of water of Magallanes Region
Landforms of Tierra del Fuego Province, Argentina
Borders of Chile
Antarctic region